Indirect presidential elections were held in Gran Colombia on 4 May 1830 following the resignation of incumbent President Simón Bolívar. Joaquín Mosquera was elected President, whilst Domingo Caycedo was elected Vice President.

Background
Suffering from ill-health, President Bolívar resigned in January 1830 during a Constitutional Convention. He named Domingo Caycedo as his successor until a Congressional vote in May.

Results

President

Vice President

Aftermath
Mosquera and Caycedo were forced out of office on 4 September under pressure from the military. General Rafael Urdaneta was appointed interim president the following day whilst a response from Bolívar on whether he would return to the Presidency was awaited. However, he refused to accept the post, and gave his support to Urdaneta. Bolívar died in December.

Following a brief civil war in early 1831, Urdaneta left office and elections were held for a Constituent Assembly. Presidential elections were held the following year.

References

Colombia
Presidential elections in Colombia
President